Macaria is a genus of moths in the family Geometridae erected by John Curtis in 1826. It is sometimes placed as a synonym of Semiothisa. Species are cosmopolitan.

Description
Palpi hairy, obliquely porrect (extending forward), and reaching beyond the short frontal tuft. Antennae of male ciliated, rarely serrate (shaped like a saw tooth). Forewings of male with a fovea. Vein 3 from angle of cell. veins 7, 8 and 9 stalked from upper angle, vein 10 absent and vein 11 free. Hindwings with the strongly angled outer margin at vein 4 and slightly at vein 6. Vein 3 from angle of cell.

Species
Species include:

 Macaria abydata Guenée, [1858] - dot-lined angle
 Macaria aemulataria Walker, 1861 - common angle moth
 Macaria adonis Barnes & McDunnough, 1918
 Macaria aequiferaria Walker, 1861
 Macaria alternata Denis & Schiffermüller, 1775
 Macaria artesiaria (Denis & Schiffermüller, 1775)
 Macaria banksianae Ferguson, 1974
 Macaria bicolorata Fabricius, 1798 - bicolored angle moth
 Macaria bisignata Walker, 1866 - red-headed inchworm moth
 Macaria brunneata Thunberg] 1784
 Macaria carbonaria (Clerck, 1759)
 Macaria distribuaria (Hübner, 1825) - southern coastal plain angle moth
 Macaria fissinotata Walker, 1863 - hemlock angle moth
 Macaria fusca (Thunberg, 1792)
 Macaria granitata Guenée, 1857 - granite moth
 Macaria liturata Clerck, 1759
 Macaria loricaria (Eversmann, 1837)
 Macaria minorata Packard, 1873
 Macaria multilineata Packard, 1873 - many-lined angle moth
 Macaria notata (Linnaeus, 1758) - birch angle moth
 Macaria oweni (Swett, 1907)
 Macaria pinistrobata (Ferguson, 1972) - white pine angle moth
 Macaria ponderosae Ferguson, 2008
 Macaria promiscuata (Ferguson, 1974) - promiscuous angle
 Macaria sanfordi (Rindge, 1958)
 Macaria sexmaculata Packard, 1867
 Macaria signaria Hübner, 1809 - pale-marked angle moth
 Macaria submarmorata Walker, 1861
 Macaria transitaria Walker, 1861 - blurry chocolate angle moth
 Macaria unipunctaria (W. S. Wright, 1916)
 Macaria wauaria (Linnaeus, 1758)

References

Macariini
Taxa named by John Curtis